Stephen Hepburn (born 6 December 1959) is a British politician, who was the Member of Parliament for Jarrow from 1997 to 2019. Hepburn was a member of the Labour Party until 7 October 2019, when he was suspended from the party following an accusation of sexual harassment. He then sat as an independent and was barred by the party from standing as a Labour candidate.

Early life
Stephen Hepburn was born on 6 December 1959 to Peter and Margaret Hepburn in Jarrow, South Tyneside. He was educated at Springfield School, Jarrow (now Jarrow School) and the University of Newcastle upon Tyne where he studied politics. He worked as a personal assistant to Donald Dixon (MP for Jarrow).

Early career
He was elected as a councillor to South Tyneside Borough Council in 1985, becoming the deputy leader for seven years in 1990, and he remained a councillor whilst serving as an MP. Hepburn served as the chairman of Tyne and Wear Pensions for eight years from 1989. In the 1990s, he was fined £75 for an assault on fellow councillor Iain Malcolm.

Parliamentary career
He was elected to the British House of Commons for Jarrow following Dixon's retirement at the 1997 general election. Hepburn won the seat with a majority of 21,933. He made his maiden speech on 21 May 1997, in which he mentioned Ellen Wilkinson and the 1936 Jarrow March.

He served on both the administration and the defence select committees for four years from 1997. He was on the Accommodation and Works Committee from 2003 until the 2005 general election, following which he served on the Northern Ireland select committee. He also served as the chairman of the all party group on shipbuilding and ship repair, and was secretary of the all party group on football.

On 7 October 2019, Hepburn was suspended from the Labour Party pending an investigation into alleged sexual harassment of a female party member in 2005. He denied the allegation.

References

External links

1959 births
Living people
People from Jarrow
Politicians from Tyne and Wear
Labour Party (UK) MPs for English constituencies
English politicians convicted of crimes
English people convicted of assault
Alumni of Newcastle University
UK MPs 1997–2001
UK MPs 2001–2005
UK MPs 2005–2010
UK MPs 2010–2015
UK MPs 2015–2017
UK MPs 2017–2019
Independent members of the House of Commons of the United Kingdom